Carolyn S. Griner (born 1945) is an American astronautical engineer. She served as the Acting Director of the NASA Marshall Space Flight Center from January 3, 1998 to September 11, 1998, between the terms of the eighth and ninth Directors. Before and after her term as Acting Director, she was Deputy Director of the Marshall Center.  She retired from NASA on December 11, 2000.  She is currently a Vice President of Science Applications International Corporation in Huntsville, Alabama.

Griner joined the Marshall staff in 1964. She has received numerous awards throughout her career, including the NASA Exceptional Service Medal in 1986, the Presidential Rank of Meritorious Executive in 1992 and the Presidential Rank of Distinguished Executive in 1995.

On June 30, 1999, Griner received the space agency's highest honor, the Distinguished Service Medal, for her extraordinary contributions to NASA's missions.

She earned her bachelor's degree in astronautical engineering from Florida State University in Tallahassee in 1967. She has completed graduate work in industrial and systems engineering at the University of Alabama in Huntsville.

References

External links 
 NASA History Division - Center Directors

NASA people
Florida State University alumni
University of Alabama alumni
Living people
1945 births
Directors of the Marshall Space Flight Center